Gol Tappeh Rural District may refer to:
 Gol Tappeh Rural District (Hamadan Province)
 Gol Tappeh Rural District (Kurdistan Province)